First Baptist Church of Mumford is a historic Baptist church located at Mumford in Monroe County, New York. It was built in 1852, and is a three-by-four-bay, vernacular Greek Revival–style frame church building on a cobblestone foundation. It features a square, three stage tower.  Minor expansions and alterations were done to the building through 1917.

It was listed on the National Register of Historic Places in 2010.

References

Churches on the National Register of Historic Places in New York (state)
Baptist churches in New York (state)
Churches completed in 1852
19th-century Baptist churches in the United States
Greek Revival church buildings in New York (state)
Churches in Monroe County, New York
National Register of Historic Places in Monroe County, New York
1852 establishments in New York (state)